The 2022 Green Party of England and Wales Party deputy leadership election was held between 1 July and 7 September 2022 to determine the next deputy leader of the Green Party of England and Wales. Voting took place from 1 to 30 August 2022.

On 5 March 2022, the party's then deputy leader, Amelia Womack, announced she would not be standing to be re-elected in the party's 2022 deputy leadership election. She had been the party's deputy leader for eight years, having first been elected to the role in 2014, and subsequently re-elected three times since (in 2016, 2018 and 2020).

To qualify for the ballot, candidates needed nominations from 20 of the party's members.

Four candidates, Zack Polanski, Shahrar Ali, Nick Humberstone, and Tyrone Scott qualified on 1 July 2022. 

The results were announced on 7 September 2022. In the first round no candidate received 50% or more of the vote. Zack Polanski placed highest with 42% of the vote in the first round, followed by Tyrone Scott with 28%, while Shahrar Ali received 24% and Nick Humberstone, 6%. Zack Polanski was elected for the role after several rounds of counting second and third preferences with 51% of the vote. 

Turnout was low, with 6,266 of more than 50,000 members eligible to vote casting votes (12.5%).

See also
 2021 Green Party of England and Wales leadership election
 2020 Green Party of England and Wales leadership election

References

External links
 Confirmed: The four candidates standing for the Green Party deputy leadership. Bright Green. Published 1 July 2022.
 Deputy leadership elections – who's who?. Green World. Published 21 July 2022.

2022 elections in the United Kingdom
2022 political party leadership elections
July 2022 events in the United Kingdom
August 2022 events in the United Kingdom
September 2022 events in the United Kingdom
Green Party of England and Wales leadership elections